Nougat is a family of confections made with sugar or honey, roasted nuts (almonds, walnuts, pistachios, hazelnuts, and macadamia nuts are common), whipped egg whites, and sometimes chopped candied fruit. The consistency of nougat is chewy, and it is used in a variety of candy bars and chocolates. The word nougat comes from Occitan , seemingly from Latin  'nut bread' (the late colloquial Latin adjective  means 'nutted' or 'nutty').

Two basic kinds of nougat exist. The first, and most common, is white nougat or Persian nougat ( in Iran;  in Spain), made with beaten egg whites and honey; it appeared in the early 7th century in Spain with Arabs. In Alicante, Spain there are several published recipes in the 16th century, for instance ”La Generosa Paliza” by Lope de Rueda and other novels written by Cervantes  and in Montélimar, France, in the 18th century (Nougat of Montélimar). The second is brown nougat ( in French, literally 'black nougat';  in Italian, meaning 'crunchy'), which is made without egg whites and has a firmer, often crunchy texture.

History
Many legends exist around nougat's origins. Early recipes of white nougat were found in a Middle Eastern book in Baghdad the 10th century. That nougat was called  . One of these recipes indicates that the  comes from Harran, a city located between Urfa (now in southeast Turkey) and Aleppo, Syria.

Distribution and popularity
In southern Europe, nougat is a prominent component of Christmas meals.

The nougat that appears in many candy bars in the United States and United Kingdom differs from traditional recipes and consists of sucrose and corn syrup aerated with a whipping agent (such as egg white, hydrolyzed soya protein or gelatine); it may also include vegetable fats and milk powder. Typically, it is combined with nuts, caramel, or chocolate. Some American confections feature this type of nougat as the primary component, rather than combined with other elements. Varieties of nougat are found in Milky Way, Reese's Fast Break, Snickers, Double Decker, ZERO bars, and Baby Ruth bars. "Fluffy nougat" is the featured ingredient in the 3 Musketeers bar.

In Britain, nougat is traditionally made in the style of the southern European varieties, and is commonly found at fairgrounds and seaside resorts. The most common industrially produced type is coloured pink and white, the pink often fruit flavoured, and sometimes wrapped in edible rice paper with almonds and cherries.

When nougat spread to Taiwan, preparers there began to add milk powder as the main raw material, plus sugar, cream, protein (some companies use whey protein refined from fresh milk instead of protein and protein powder), nuts (such as peanuts, almonds, walnuts, pistachios or hazelnuts), dried fruit and petals (such as cranberry, golden pomelo, mango, orange, longan, and osmanthus). These secondary raw materials have become unique features of Taiwanese nougat. 

Compared to table-top nougat, French European nougat does not have any milk or milk powder ingredients. It is made by adding sugar or honey to egg whites and sprinkling in almonds or nuts. In addition, some manufacturers use edible rice paper to prevent the nougat from being deformed, but the amount used affects the taste, so preferences vary from person to person.

Variations

Spanish nougat known as  follows the traditional recipes with toasted nuts (commonly almonds), sugar, honey, and egg whites.

 from Italy includes these same basic ingredients as well as vanilla or citrus flavoring, and is often sandwiched between two very thin sheets of rice paper.

"Wiener (Viennese) Nougat"  is a variant that contains only sugar, cocoa butter, nuts, and cocoa mass and has a mellow consistency. The nuts used for Viennese nougat are usually hazelnuts. In Germany and the Nordic countries, Viennese nougat is traditionally labelled as nougat, while in Sweden and Denmark, the original nougat is referred to as "French nougat". In Germany, gianduja is traditionally called nougat.

See also
 Chocolate
 Divinity (confectionery)
 Dodol
 Gaz (candy)
 Halva
 Lokum
 Turrón
 White Christmas (food)
 Chikki

References

Almonds
Azerbaijani desserts
Confectionery
Cuisine of Sicily
Cuisine of Veneto
Greek desserts
Iranian desserts
Israeli cuisine
Nut dishes
Occitan desserts
Tabriz cuisine
Honey dishes